Waliły  is a village in north-eastern Poland, in the administrative district of Gmina Gródek, within Białystok County, Podlaskie Voivodeship, close to the border with Belarus.

The village has a population of 290.

Born 
 Leon Tarasewicz - Polish artist of Belarusian origin.

References

Villages in Białystok County